Adenylyltransferase and sulfurtransferase MOCS3 may refer to:
 Molybdopterin synthase sulfurtransferase, an enzyme
 Molybdopterin-synthase adenylyltransferase, an enzyme